There are five main brass band sections in the United Kingdom: Championship, First, Second, Third, and Fourth. Sometimes, a Youth section is also used, but this is not graded.

Championship section
This is the section containing the very best bands in the United Kingdom who compete in the Open and National Brass Band Championships, established in 1853 and 1860 respectively. Bands such as Cory Band, Black Dyke, Brighouse and Rastrick, Fairey and Grimethorpe are placed in here. A few of these have professional or semi-professional players, but the contest has always been designed towards amateur musicians.

The test pieces set for or commissioned by this section are extremely difficult and use complicated musical conventions and techniques to challenge the musicians. Music composed for this section in recent years has included "Eden" by John Pickard and "Montreux Wind Dances" by Carl Rütti.

There are a range of different competitions for this section from the Regional Qualifying Contests (also known as "Areas") to the European Brass Band Championships.

The top ten bands in the Championship section (ordered by Band Supplies / British Bandsman / 4barsrest.com Ranking, as of 5 June 2022) are;

First, Second, and Third sections
The First section is the next section down from the Championship section, and although the contest music is not as challenging, it is still quite difficult to play. The degree of difficulty of the music used in competitions is progressively less for each section. Many individual players in the First section can match the virtuosity of Championship section players, and the gap between the two sections is always hotly contested, as indeed it is between Second and First. Very often the only reason a band from the top of one section does not successfully migrate up to the next section lies in their interpretation of a test piece at a contest, where their fate lies in the hands of an adjudicator. The adjudicator sits enclosed and unable to see the bands as they play, and then judges them on various points, one of which is interpretation. In the past, deportment was one of the judgeable factors, but this is no longer part of contest judgement. On many occasions success or failure will depend on very small matters or mistakes, and this closeness between bands often increases in the higher sections.

Although many of the players at the top are truly virtuoso musicians, outside the genre they are seldom well known. All are amateurs (players pay for the privilege of being allowed to play with a band), and every player knows that if his or her musicianship is not up to standard, there are other musicians trying for their seat (their place in the band).  This means that player rivalry exists even within an individual band.

Fourth section
Most Fourth section bands try to move up the ranks to Third section, and so they set themselves musical tasks to enable them to improve. These tend to include the simpler marches and old test pieces. The marches and other compositions of the Welsh composer and conductor T. J. Powell remain constant favourites.

One of the principal reasons for a decline into Fourth section status lies in the difficulties of recruiting new players. In the past when Britain had extensive heavy industries, these would sponsor brass bands, who would then bear their name.  For example, the once-great Melin Griffith Band of Cardiff was adopted by Excelsior Rope Works when the Melingriffith Tin Plate Works closed down, and then they became the Excelsior Rope Works Band. The decline in industrial sponsorship removed the financial backing which supported such vital items as a practice room, uniforms, instruments, stands, chairs, and music, which taken together cost far more than a subscription band can ever afford.  However, with very few exceptions, these bands have been struggling to get by supported only by the members' subscriptions, the occasional sponsored concerts, and playing Christmas carols. Not infrequently, practice rooms become unavailable, adding still more to the pressure to disband, and many bands have disappeared or amalgamated in recent years. A further problem is that players of ability would normally rather play in a band which stretches them, so it becomes hard to recruit good players for a lower section band, and this increases the problem.

Youth section
Youth bands are not usually registered and are not graded, and so they do not really compare with the above sections. However, Youth bands may be permitted to perform in competitions.  At some major competitions (e.g. Whit Friday and Pontins), there is a youth section prize awarded, but this is not common.

Youth bands suffer from some perennial problems, because players grow too old for the band and leave, causing the strength of the band to wane and then grow again. Also, as many youth band players are not fully-grown, they do not have the sound capacity of the adult bands; however, this may be offset by their enthusiasm.

The very best three or four youth bands will be around the standard of the top First section and lower Championship section bands.  However, their strength undulates, so a youth band could sweep all before them in August, and then collapse in September when all the top players leave for university.

The main competitions for youth bands are the Action Medical Research Youth Entertainment Championships, the National Youth Brass Band Championships of Great Britain, and the brass band section of Music for Youth.

The National Youth Brass Band Champions of Great Britain are "Youth Brass 2000" who have won this award for 4 consecutive years. They have also come second in the Europeans top section for 3 consecutive years (the latest 2 have also won best soloist).

The National Brass Band Championships of Great Britain

The National Brass Band Championships are split into two parts. The first is the Area contest where bands across all sections compete to qualify for the national Finals.

The contest is run as a yearly event.  The Area contests usually take place in March.  The second part of the competition – the Finals – takes place the following September or October. Each section is assigned its own test piece. These test pieces are usually announced at the lower section Finals in September (or sometimes even before). In early June (after the qualifying bands from the Area contests have been decided), the set works for the Finals are announced.

There are eight Areas: West of England, London & Southern Counties, Midlands, Wales, North West, Yorkshire, North of England, and Scotland.

Since the Lower Section Finals in 2011, the Finals of Sections 1 through 4 are held at The Centaur, Cheltenham Racecourse, and the Championship Section Finals are held in the Royal Albert Hall, London.

Championship Winners

British contesting year
Other organisations' contests and championships are spread out over the year.

Promotion and relegation
At the end of the competing season, the top two bands from each section are promoted to the next section up, and the bottom two are relegated to the section below. Several factors are used in determining who is promoted and relegated, and a band must perform consistently for three years, because the scores are aggregated over the previous two years. Therefore, a relegated band will usually have to spend at least two years in the section below before it can make its comeback.

There are some shortcuts; for example, a band winning the National Title for its section is automatically promoted for the following year.

Brass band rankings
Controversial rankings of the bands are published by 4BarsRest and Brass Band World; however, each should be compared by how they compile their rankings.  Often it is the band which has competed successfully in the most competitions that wins the highest ranking.  However, some competitions give more points than others, so this also affects who is number one.

Non-contesting bands

Participation in the whole contesting and ranking exercise is not compulsory, and there exist brass bands in the UK which for any number of reasons choose not to do so; these are known as non-contesting bands.

University bands
Like Youth bands, University bands are usually not registered, as many players are shared with other registered bands. Furthermore, the standard of many university brass bands oscillates widely every year when a third of their players graduate and are replaced. This means the standard contesting sections can struggle to reflect the actual standard of the bands. Even those university bands who are not registered often compete in contests which allow "scratch", unregistered, or university bands. Some major competitions (e.g. Whit Friday) award a university section prize, but this is even rarer than for youth bands.

The main inter-university brass band contest is UniBrass, the National University Brass Band Championships of Great Britain and Northern Ireland. UniBrass is an annual entertainment contest organised by students, supported by the UniBrass Foundation (a registered charity in England and Wales). University bands are separated into two sections, the Trophy and the Shield, which run concurrently over one day in February. The first UniBrass contest took place in Lancaster in 2011. UniBrass 2023 will be hosted by the University of Warwick.

The current National University Brass Band Champions of Great Britain and Northern Ireland are "Royal Birmingham Conservatoire Brass Band", having won the UniBrass Trophy in 2022. The University of Leeds Brass Band won the UniBrass Shield in 2022.

See also 

 Musical instrument

References 
Citations

Sources

 
 

British brass bands

de:Brass Band
fr:Brass band
nl:Brassband
no:Brassband
nn:Brassband
sv:Brassband